Welcome to the Morbid Reich is the ninth studio album by the Polish death metal band Vader. The album was released on 12 August 2011 by Nuclear Blast. The release was preceded by a digital download single for the song "Come And See My Sacrifice", which was released on 26 July 2011. The album has won a Fryderyk Award in the category 'Heavy Metal Album of the Year (Album roku heavy metal)', and reached number 17 on the Billboard Top New Artist Albums (Heatseekers), and number 25 on the Hard Rock Albums. In Poland, Welcome to the Morbid Reich landed at number 6, and dropped out four weeks later. The release also charted in France, Japan, Switzerland, and Germany.

On 5 April 2011, Vader released the first part of their studio report for the album. Subsequently, the second part was released on 14 April, the third part was released on 30 April, the fourth part was released on 11 May, the fifth part was released on 24 May, and the sixth part was released on 7 June.

Welcome to the Morbid Reich was recorded between March and April 2011 at Hertz Studio in Białystok, Poland, and was produced by the Wiesławscy Brothers, and features cover artwork by Zbigniew Bielak. The album is the final Vader release to feature drummer Paweł "Paul" Jaroszewicz, and the first to feature guitarist Marek "Spider" Pająk as band member. Piotr "Peter" Wiwczarek described work on the album, saying:

Track listing

Personnel
Production and performance credits are adapted from the album liner notes.

"Come and See My Sacrifice"

"Come and See My Sacrifice" is the eight single by the Polish death metal band Vader. It was released on 26 July 2011 by Nuclear Blast.

Track listing

Charts

Weekly

Monthly

Release history

References

Vader (band) albums
2011 albums
Nuclear Blast albums